Néstor Rodrigo Matamala Molina (born 13 October 1940) is a Chilean football manager and} Youth Soccer Team Owner and Teacher/Trainer Academia de Fútbol Nestor R. Matamala and FC Juventud Henerma.

Managerial career
Néstor Rodrigo Matamala has coached a number of Honduran teams, including Real C.D. España, Platense F.C., C.D. Olimpia and F.C. Motagua. He coached the Izabal de Puerto Barrios of Guatemala and C.D. Águila of El Salvador. He now has a Soccer Academy and the name of his Soccer Team is FC Juventud Henerma. He has joined Alliance with Marcet Soccer in Spain and is in the process of joining alliances with other Soccer Teams from Europe and South America.
In May 1993, he was asked as caretaker for the El Salvador last game during World Cup 1994 qualifying campaign.

He won three league titles of the Honduran Liga Nacional with Motagua (1978–79), Real España (1980–81) and Olimpia (1986–87).

Honours
Motagua
 Honduran Liga Nacional: 1978–79

Real España
 Honduran Liga Nacional: 1980–81

Olimpia
 Honduran Liga Nacional: 1986–87

References

External links
 Néstor Matamala at PlaymakerStats
  
 Academia de Fútbol Nestor R. Matamala
 FC Juventud Henerma

1940 births
Living people
People from Cautín Province
Chilean football managers
F.C. Motagua managers
Real C.D. España managers
Platense F.C. managers
C.D. Olimpia managers
C.D. Marathón managers
C.D. Águila managers
Real Estelí F.C. managers
El Salvador national football team managers
Chilean expatriate sportspeople in Guatemala
Chilean expatriate sportspeople in Honduras
Chilean expatriate sportspeople in El Salvador
Chilean expatriate sportspeople in Nicaragua
Expatriate football managers in Guatemala
Expatriate football managers in Honduras
Expatriate football managers in El Salvador
Expatriate football managers in Nicaragua
Chilean expatriate football managers
Naturalised citizens of Honduras